During the medieval and later feudal/colonial periods, many parts of western regions of the Indian subcontinent were ruled as sovereign or princely states by various houses of Jadeja dynasty.

Salute states

Non-salute states 
Imperial Gazetteer, Princely states in Halar region, on dsal.uchicago.edu</ref>

See also
 Lunar Dynasty
 List of Rajput dynasties
 List of princely states of British India (by region)

References

Princely states of India
1948 disestablishments in India
History of Gujarat
Rajputs